Avianova was an Italian airline that was integrated into Alitalia in 1997.

History
Avianova was founded in Sardinia in 1986 and began operations using three ATR 42. More ATR 42s were acquired later as Alitalia invested in the airline and hence Avianova became part of the Alitalia Group. Other aircraft used were the Fokker 70 and Saab 340. In 1995, the ATR 72 was added to the fleet. Avianova offered regional and scheduled services. In 1996 it became part of the Alitalia Express and it was integrated into the Alitalia Group in 1997.

Fleet

References

External links

 In memoriam Avianova
 Fleet information

Italian companies disestablished in 1996
Defunct airlines of Italy
Airlines established in 1986
Airlines disestablished in 1996
Transport in Sardinia
Italian companies established in 1986